Haddam Meadows State Park is a public recreation area occupying  on the west bank of the Connecticut River in the town of Haddam, Connecticut. The state park offers picnicking, fishing, and a boat launch. Park trails lend access to a diversity of riverside landscapes: marsh, beach, sand bar, fern growths, meadow lands, and hardwood forest. The park was established through the donation of land in 1944 by the Edward W. Hazen Foundation. It is managed by the Connecticut Department of Energy and Environmental Protection.

References

External links
Haddam Meadows State Park Connecticut Department of Energy and Environmental Protection
Haddam Meadows State Park Map Connecticut Department of Energy and Environmental Protection

State parks of Connecticut
Parks in Middlesex County, Connecticut
Protected areas established in 1944
1944 establishments in Connecticut
Haddam, Connecticut